Jacob Amos Salzmann (1901–1992) was an American orthodontist who is known for developing an assessment index for determining malocclusion. This index has been adopted by ADA Council of Dental Health, the Council on Dental Care Programs, and by the American Association of Orthodontists.

Life
He attended  the University of Pennsylvania School of Dental Medicine and received his dental degree in 1923. He was in General Dentistry practice for 7 years and he then went to New York City and became an associate of Martin Dewey. He also worked with John Mershon and George Callaway. He was Editor-in-Chief for the New York Journal of Dentistry for 26 years. He was the founder and director of the Cleft Palate Clinic at Mount Sinai Hospital (Manhattan), New York City. He was fellow of the American Association for the Advancement of Science, American College of Dentists, International College of Dentists, Society for Research in Child Development, and New York Academy of Dentistry. He also represented the Orthodontists Public Health Committee at several White House conferences in 1950, 1960 and 1970. In addition, he was the adviser to the United States Public Health Service during his career.

Salzmann focused his research on caries frequency and tooth shifting after loss of first molars, dentofacial growth in children on fluoridated and fluoride-free water, dentofacial anomalies of systemic and endocrine origin, genetics and dentofacial anomalies. Salzmann was an outspoken advocate of early dental and orthodontic treatment for children in 1920s and 1930s.

He died at the age of 91.

Positions and awards
 American Association of Orthodontists, President
 American Board of Orthodontics, President
 Albert H. Ketcham Award, 1966
 Distinguished Service Award, 1961 and 1974
 Henry Spenadel Award by New York Dental Society

Textbooks
 Principles and Practice Public Health Dentistry, 1937
 Orthodontics: Principles and Prevention, 1943
 Orthodontics: Practice and Techniques, 1950
 Practice of Orthodontics, 1967
 Orthodontics in Daily Practice, 1975
 Roentgenographic Cephalometrics, 1961
 Orthodontics to Rhinoplasty-New Concepts, 1970

References

American orthodontists
1901 births
1966 deaths
University of Pennsylvania School of Dental Medicine alumni
20th-century dentists